Gottfried Wilhelm Leibniz (1646–1716) was a German philosopher and mathematician.

In engineering, the following concepts are attributed to Leibniz:

 Leibniz wheel, a cylinder used in a class of mechanical calculators
 Leibniz calculator,  a digital mechanical calculator based on the Leibniz wheel

In mathematics, several results and concepts are named after Leibniz:

 Leibniz algebra, an algebraic structure
 Dual Leibniz algebra
 Madhava–Leibniz series
 Leibniz formula for π, an inefficient method for calculating π
 Leibniz formula for determinants, an expression for the determinant of a matrix
 Leibniz harmonic triangle
 Leibniz integral rule, a rule for differentiation under the integral sign
 Leibniz–Reynolds transport theorem, a generalization of the Leibniz integral rule
 Leibniz's linear differential equation, a first-order, linear, inhomogeneous differential equation
 Leibniz's notation, a notation in calculus
 Leibniz operator, a concept in abstract logic
 Leibniz law, see product rule of calculus
 Leibniz rule, a formula used to find the derivatives of products of two or more functions
 General Leibniz rule, a generalization of the product rule
 Leibniz's test, also known as Leibniz's rule or Leibniz's criterion
 Newton–Leibniz axiom

In philosophy, the following concepts are attributed to Leibniz:

 Leibniz's gap, a problem in the philosophy of mind
 Leibniz's law, an ontological principle about objects' properties

Additionally, the following are named after Leibniz:
 5149 Leibniz, an asteroid
 Gottfried Wilhelm Leibniz Bibliothek in Hanover, Germany
 Gottfried Wilhelm Leibniz Prize, a German research prize
 Leibnitz, a lunar crater
 The Leibniz Association, a union of German research institutes
 The Leibniz Review, a peer-reviewed academic journal devoted to scholarly examination of Gottfried Leibniz's thought and work
 Leibniz University of Hannover, a German university
 Leibniz Institute of Agricultural Development in Transition Economies, a research institute located in Halle (Saale)
 Leibniz Institute for Astrophysics Potsdam, a German research institute in the area of astrophysics
 Leibniz institute for molecular pharmacology, a research institute in the Leibniz Association
 Leibniz Institute for Science and Mathematics Education at the University of Kiel, a scientific institute in the field of Education Research
 Leibniz Institute for Solid State and Materials Research, a research institute in the Leibniz Association
 Leibniz Society of North America, a philosophical society whose purpose is to promote the study of the philosophy of Gottfried Wilhelm Leibniz
 Leibniz-Keks, a German brand of biscuit
 Leibniz–Clarke correspondence, Leibniz' debate with the English philosopher Samuel Clarke
 Leibniz–Newton calculus controversy, the debate over whether Leibniz or Isaac Newton invented calculus

References

Leibniz, Gottfried
Gottfried Wilhelm Leibniz